The Borkumer Kleinbahn is a  narrow gauge railway on the German island of Borkum in the North Sea. It is the oldest island railway in Germany, beginning operation in 1888.

Line
It is double tracked since the early 20th century.

History
In 1879, tracks for a horse-drawn railway line were laid for the construction of a new lighthouse. The tracks were converted for locomotive-hauled trains about 10 years later, and the line opened in 1888 as a successor of the horsedrawn line. The line celebrated its 125th anniversary on June 15, 2013.

Rolling stock
The fleet consists of multiple passenger cars, diesel locomotives, steam locomotives and a Wismar railbus, which was built in 1940. A steam locomotive from the Bäderbahn Molli is scheduled to run on the line in summer 2019. Both Bäderbahn Molli and the Borkumer Kleinbahn have the same  track gauge.

References

External links

 

Transport in Lower Saxony
900 mm gauge railways in Germany
Borkum